Gentiana bredboensis commonly known as Bredbo gentian, is a flowering plant in the family Gentianaceae and is endemic to New South Wales. It is a small annual herb with white flowers.

Description

Taxonomy and naming
Gentiana bredboensis was first formally described in 1988 by Laurence George Adams and the description was published in Telopea. The specific epithet (bredboensis) is in reference to the type location near the Bredbo River.

Distribution and habitat
This gentiana has a restricted distribution near the Bredbo River on sandy, granitic soils in very wet conditions.

Conservation status
Gentiana bredboensis is classified as "critically endangered" under the New South Wales Environment Protection and Biodiversity Conservation Act.

References

bredboensis
Flora of New South Wales